Bánd is a village in Veszprém county, Hungary.

References

External links 
 Street map (Hungarian)
 Pictures, history, and google map of Essegvár castle

Populated places in Veszprém County